Tim Gallagher is a writer and wildlife photographer and the author of six books: Parts Unknown, a Naturalist's Journey in Search of Birds and Wild Places; The Grail Bird, Hot on the Trail of the Ivory-billed Woodpecker; Falcon Fever, A Falconer in the 21st Century; Imperial Dreams, Tracking the Imperial Woodpecker Through the Wild Sierra Madre; Born to Fish, How An Obsessed Angler Became the World's Greatest Striped Bass Fisherman; and Wild Bird Photography, A Full-Color Guide. He was editor-in-chief of the Cornell Lab of Ornithology's Living Bird magazine for 26 years and before that was on the start-up editorial staff first managing editor of WildBird magazine.

In 2004, Gallagher reported sighting an ivory-billed woodpicker in the Big Woods of Arkansas; however, a subsequent expedition led by the Cornell Lab of Ornithology was unable to confirm his sighting. Gallagher's book about the experience, The Grail Bird: Hot on the Trail of the Ivory-billed Woodpecker, was published in May 2005.

Gallagher was born in England and received a B.A. in magazine journalism, and an M.F.A. in English, both from California State University, Long Beach.

References

External links
Details of search for the Ivory-billed Woodpecker
Interview with Tim Gallagher
"Return to the Bayou," field notes from the search for the ivory-billed woodpecker by Tim Gallagher

Year of birth missing (living people)
Living people
American male journalists
American ornithologists
Place of birth missing (living people)
California State University alumni